The women's heptathlon event  at the Friendship Games was held on 16 and 17 August 1984 at the Evžen Rošický Stadium in Prague, Czechoslovakia.

Results

See also
Athletics at the 1984 Summer Olympics – Women's heptathlon

References
 

Athletics at the Friendship Games
Friendship Games